The Solomon Islands has competed at the IAAF World Athletics Championships on thirteen occasions, competing in 1983 then every edition since 1995. Its competing country code is SOL. The country has not won any medals at the competition and as of 2022 no Solomon Islander athlete has progressed beyond the first round of an event.

2019

The Solomon Islands will compete at the 2019 World Championships in Athletics in Doha, Qatar, from 27 September 2019.

References 

 
Solomon Islands
World Championships in Athletics